The Singapore Hit Awards 2007 (Chinese: 新加坡金曲奖 2007) is a music award organised by Y.E.S. 93.3FM in association with the Recording Industry Association Singapore.

The award ceremony was held at the Singapore Indoor Stadium on 27 October 2007.

Nominees and winners 
Winners are highlighted in bold.

Best New Act 最佳新人
 Mi Lu Bing (迷路兵) - 迷路兵首张同名专辑
 Chew Sin Huey (石欣卉) - 从台北到北京
 Hong Jun Yang (洪俊扬) - 独角兽
 Jasmine - 雨声
 Evan Yo - 首张创作专辑19
 Cherry Boom - 亲爱的王子
 Fahrenheit - 飞轮海首张同名专辑

Best Group 最佳组合 
 Nan Quan Mama - 藏宝图
 S.H.E - Play
 Kangta & Vanness - Scandal
 Fahrenheit - 飞轮海首张同名专辑
 Twins - Around the World with 80 Dollars

Best Band 最佳乐团 
 Mi Lu Bing (迷路兵) - 迷路兵首张同名专辑
 F.I.R - 飞行部落
 Cherry Boom - 亲爱的王子
 Mayday - 为爱而生
 Sodagreen - 小宇宙

Best Local Male Artist 最佳本地男歌手 
 Mi Lu Bing (迷路兵) - 迷路兵首张同名专辑
 Huang Yida - 完整演出
 JJ Lin (林俊杰) - 西界
 Hong Jun Yang - 独角兽

Best Composing Artist 最佳创作歌手 
 Leehom Wang - 改变自己
 Khalil Fong - This Love 爱爱爱
 Gary Chaw - Superman
 JJ Lin (林俊杰) - 西界
 Mayday - 为爱而生

Most Popular Male Artist (Listener’s Choice)
 JJ Lin (林俊杰)
 Nicholas Teo (张栋梁)
 Gary Cao (曹格)
 Jay Chou (周杰伦)
 Pin Guan (品冠)
 Jacky Cheung (张学友)
 Kenji Wu (吴克群)
 niu nai (牛奶)
 Eason Chan (陈奕迅)
 Tank

Most Popular Female Artist (Listener’s Choice)
 Valen Hsu (许茹芸)
 Jolin Tsai (蔡依林)
 Ho Yeow Sun (何耀珊)
 Chew Sin Huey (石欣卉)
 Stefanie Sun (孙燕姿)
 Angela Chang (张韶涵)
 Fish Leong (梁静茹)
 Joey Yeung (容祖儿)
 Gigi Leung (梁咏琪)
 Elva Hsiao (萧亚轩)

Most Popular Group (Listener’s Choice)
 Mi Lu Bing (迷路兵)
 Fahrenheit (飞轮海)
 Mayday (五月天)
 S.H.E
 Twins
 F.I.R (飞儿乐团)
 Energy
 183 Club
 Sodagreen (苏打绿)
 Kangta * Vanness (吴建豪、安七炫)

Most Popular Newcomer (Listener’s Choice)
 Mi Lu Bing (迷路兵)
 Daren Tan Sze Wei (陈世维)
 Diya Tan (陈迪雅)
 Fahrenheit (飞轮海)
 Chew Sin Huey (石欣卉)
 Hong Jun Yang (洪俊扬)
 Ting Chu (庭竹)
 Li Yuchun
 Cherry Boom (樱桃帮)
 Evan Yo (蔡旻佑)

Incidents 
After the nomination list was released, Shi Xin Hui was not nominated for Best Local Artiste. Programme director Foong Wai See replied that the award was awarded to Singaporean or Singaporean Permanent Resident (PR). Warner Music Group's marketing director James Kang protested that Shi was already a Singaporean PR when she released her album but was not publicised. Shi was however nominated for other awards.

During the award ceremony, many nominated artistes, including local artistes, did not turn up due to other events leading to organisers to comment the local artistes unpatriotic and not supporting their local awards.

References

External links
Official homepage

Singaporean music
Chinese music awards
2007 in Singapore